Digeri is the name of a Thracian tribe mentioned by Pliny the Elder and Polybius.

References

See also
Thracian tribes

Ancient tribes in Thrace
Ancient tribes in the Balkans
Thracian tribes